Hu Qiuyuan (11 June 1910 - 24 May 2004) was a Chinese author, educator and politician from Taiwan.

Biography
Hu was born in June 1910 in Huangpi County, Hubei.

At the age of 15, he entered National Wuchang University. He was a member of the Chinese Communist Youth League, but had left in 1924 for the Kuomintang.

In 1928, Hu was accepted to Fudan University, where he majored in Chinese literature.

Hu went to Japan in 1929, he studied political economy at Waseda University. He returned to Shanghai in 1931.

Hu went to Hong Kong in November 1933, but he was arrested and expelled by the British Hong Kong Government.

From 1934 to 1936, Hu visited India, Egypt, the United Kingdom, the Soviet Union, and the United States.

Hu returned to China in 1937, he founded the Times Daily (《》) in Hankou, then he joined the Kuomintang.

Hu was elected to the Senate in 1940 in Chongqing. The next year, he rejoined the Kuomintang.

After the Second Sino-Japanese War, Hu was elected legislator. At the same time, he taught at Jinan University and Fudan University.

In 1949, Hu went to Hong Kong, then he settled in Taiwan in 1951. He taught at National Taiwan Normal University, Shih Hsin University, and Fu Hsing Kang College.

In 1962, Hu caught in a war of works with Li Ao and Ju Haoran.

In 1970, Hu waged a paper-warfare against Yu Guangzhong.

On 11 September 1988, Hu visited mainland China. He discussed unification with Deng Yingchao, and on 21 September, was expelled from the Kuomintang. He returned to Taiwan on 18 October, and his trip was discussed in a parliamentary session on 28 October, resulting in the first walkout of government officials in the history of the Republic of China.

Hu served as the Honorary President of Peaceful Reunification of China Alliance.

On 24 May 2004, Hu died of illness at Gengshen Hospital, in Xindian, Taipei County, aged 95.

Works
 Ancient Chinese Culture and the Chinese Intellectuals
 The History of Chinese Ideologies
 The Biography of Chinese Heroes
 The History of Russia Military Aggression
 The Speeches of Hu Qiuyuan
 In the Same Boat

Personal life
Hu married Jing Youru;  he had daughters Hu Caihe, Hu Shushi, Hu Shushan, a son Hu Bukai, and the youngest daughter Hu Puxuan.

References

1910 births
2004 deaths
Politicians from Wuhan
Fudan University alumni
Waseda University alumni
Republic of China historians
20th-century Taiwanese historians
Historians from Hubei
Educators from Hubei
Republic of China politicians from Hubei
Kuomintang Members of the Legislative Yuan in Taiwan
Academic staff of the National Taiwan Normal University
Academic staff of Jinan University
Academic staff of Fudan University
Academic staff of Shih Hsin University
Taiwanese people from Hubei
Members of the 1st Legislative Yuan
Members of the 1st Legislative Yuan in Taiwan